Pleurobema flavidulum, the yellow pigtoe, was a species of freshwater mussel, an aquatic bivalve mollusk in the family Unionidae. It was endemic to the United States. Its natural habitat was rivers. It is now extinct.

References

flavidulum
Bivalves described in 1861
Taxonomy articles created by Polbot